Baray District is a district within Kampong Thom province, in central  Cambodia.

Administration
According to the 1998 census of Cambodia, the Baray District consisted of 18 communes and had a population of 159,586. The population recorded by the 2008 census was 167,581.

In January 2019 eight of the 18 communes—Andoung Pou, Chranieng, Chrolong, Pongro, Sou Young, Sralau, Svay Phleung and Treal—were split from the district to form the Taing Kouk district.

As of 2020, the district contains the following communes.

References

Districts of Kampong Thom province